Penstemon cyaneus is a species of flowering plant in the plantain family known by the common names blue penstemon and dark-blue beardtongue. It is native to the western United States, where it is widespread in Idaho, Montana, and Wyoming.

This species is a perennial subshrub with a woody base and several erect stems reaching up to 70 centimeters tall. Most of the leaves are near the base of the plant. They are up to 15 centimeters long and have petioles. There are some leaves higher on the stem, which are smaller and clasping at their bases. The flowers are blue, sometimes with a pinkish tinge. They are up to 3.5 centimeters long by 1 centimeter wide at the flaring mouth. They are attractive to bees.

This plant grows on high plains and in sagebrush.

This species may be used in revegetation projects in wildlife habitat. It is also appropriate for landscaping in dry areas such as roadsides. It may be difficult to use because it is vulnerable to root rot infections.

References

External links

cyaneus
Flora of the United States